Uynehchi (also Romanized as Ūynehchī; also known as Eynehchī) is a village in Behi Dehbokri Rural District, Simmineh District, Bukan County, West Azerbaijan Province, Iran. At the 2006 census, its population was 134, in 23 families.

References 

Populated places in Bukan County